Fantozzi subisce ancora ("Fantozzi Succumbs Again") is a 1983 Italian comedy film directed by Neri Parenti. It is the fourth chapter in the Fantozzi film series of the unlucky clerk Ugo Fantozzi, played by its creator, Paolo Villaggio.

Plot 
New misadventures of Accountant Fantozzi: a reunion of the apartment building's tenants, the campervan holiday, the pregnancy of his daughter Mariangela, the company games of athletics, the moment of the political elections.

Cast 
 Paolo Villaggio as Ugo Fantozzi
 Milena Vukotic as  Pina Fantozzi
 Gigi Reder as  Filini
 Plinio Fernando as  Mariangela Fantozzi
 Anna Mazzamauro as  Mrs. Silvani
 Riccardo Garrone as  Luciano Calboni
 Andrea Roncato as  Loris Batacchi
 Michele Mirabella as  Fonelli Cobram II
 Ugo Bologna as  Director Count Corrado Maria Lobbiam 
  Camillo Milli as  Dottor Grandi
 Marina Hedman as The  Countess 
 Alessandro Haber as  Dr. Zamprini Loredano  
 Clara Colosimo as Nun at the Hospital 
  Carlo Colombo as  Accountant Colsi
  Antonio Francioni as Accountant Mughini 
 Antonio Allocca as The Shopkeeper
 Ennio Antonelli as  Pizzettaro

References

External links

1983 comedy films
1983 films
Films directed by Neri Parenti
Films scored by Bruno Zambrini
Italian comedy films
1980s Italian films